FlyMex is a charter airline based in Toluca, Mexico.

Fleet
The airline's fleet included the following aircraft :
Agusta A109 
Embraer 135
Embraer 145
Hawker 800XP
Learjet 45
Learjet 31
M7-420 Amphibian

Gallery

References

External links
FlyMex Fleet

Charter airlines of Mexico
Airlines of Mexico